Lisów may refer to the following places:
Lisów, Lublin Voivodeship (east Poland)
Lisów, Subcarpathian Voivodeship (south-east Poland)
Lisów, Kielce County in Świętokrzyskie Voivodeship (south-central Poland)
Lisów, Opatów County in Świętokrzyskie Voivodeship (south-central Poland)
Lisów, Białobrzegi County in Masovian Voivodeship (east-central Poland)
Lisów, Radom County in Masovian Voivodeship (east-central Poland)
Lisów, Silesian Voivodeship (south Poland)
Lisów, Lubusz Voivodeship (west Poland)
Lisów, Warmian-Masurian Voivodeship (north Poland)